Dolerus is a genus of sawflies belonging to the family Tenthredinidae.

The species of this genus are found in Europe and Northern America.

Species:
 Dolerus aeneus
 Dolerus bajulus
 Dolerus picipes
 Dolerus madidus
 Dolerus aericeps
 Dolerus germanicus
 Dolerus nitens
 Dolerus vestigialis
 Dolerus varispinus

References

Tenthredinidae
Sawfly genera